The United States competed at the 1984 Winter Olympics in Sarajevo, Yugoslavia.

Medalists 

The following U.S. competitors won medals at the games. In the by discipline sections below, medalists' names are bolded. 

| width="78%" align="left" valign="top" |

Alpine skiing

Men

Women

Biathlon

Bobsleigh

Cross-country skiing

Men

Women

Figure skating

Individual

Mixed

Ice hockey

Summary

Roster
Marc Behrend
Scott Bjugstad
Bob Brooke
Chris Chelios
Mark Fusco
Scott Fusco
Steven Griffith
Paul Guay
John Harrington
Tom Hirsch
Al Iafrate
David A. Jensen
David H. Jensen
Mark Kumpel
Pat LaFontaine
Bob Mason
Corey Millen
Ed Olczyk
Gary Sampson
Phil Verchota
Head coaches: Lou Vairo & Tim Taylor

First round
Top two teams (shaded ones) advanced to the medal round.

7th place game

Luge

Men

Women

Nordic combined

Ski jumping

Speed skating

Men

Women

References
Official Olympic Reports
 Olympic Winter Games 1984, full results by sports-reference.com
 

Nations at the 1984 Winter Olympics
1984
Oly